SS Glitra was a steam cargo ship that was launched in 1881 as Saxon Prince. In 1896 she was renamed Glitra. In 1914 she became the first British merchant vessel to be sunk by a u-boat in the First World War.

Building and ownership
Saxon Prince was the first steamship to be built for James Knott, a successful owner of collier brigs. She was also the first ship to which Knott gave a name ending in "Prince", which became a characteristic of his future Prince Line.

CS Swan & Hunter built Saxon Prince at Wallsend, launching her on 3 March 1881 and completing her that April. She had an iron hull and a two-cylinder compound steam engine. Her UK official number was 79247, her code letters were VLQW and Knott registered her in North Shields.

In 1895 Knott restructured his business as Prince Line (1895) Ltd and sold Saxon Prince to Christian Salvesen. In 1896 Salvesen renamed her Glitra and registered her in Leith.

Capture and sinking

Her crew was ordered into the lifeboat(s), and once all were safely off the ship a German boarding party scuttled Glitra by opening her seacocks.

One source states that U-17 towed the lifeboat(s) toward the Norwegian coast. Another states that the Royal Norwegian Navy 1. class torpedo boat , which was on neutrality protection duty, observed the incident but did not intervene as it was in international waters, and that after U-17 left, Hai towed the lifeboat(s) to the port of Skudeneshavn.

References

Bibliography

1881 ships
Maritime incidents in October 1914
Scuttled vessels of the United Kingdom
Ships built by Swan Hunter
Ships sunk by German submarines in World War I
Shipwrecks of Norway
Steamships of the United Kingdom
World War I merchant ships of the United Kingdom
World War I shipwrecks in the North Sea